476th may refer to:

476th Bombardment Squadron, inactive United States Air Force unit
476th Fighter Group, United States Air Force Reserve unit, stationed at Moody Air Force Base, Georgia
476th Tactical Fighter Squadron, inactive United States Air Force unit

See also
476 (number)
476 (disambiguation)
476, the year 476 (CDLXXVI) of the Julian calendar
476 BC